The Hartlepools  was a borough constituency represented in the House of Commons of the UK Parliament.  The constituency became Hartlepool in 1974.  The seat's name reflected the representation of both old Hartlepool and West Hartlepool.

History 
The Hartlepools was enfranchised as a borough constituency by the Reform Act 1867, being given one MP. It had previously been part of the two-MP county division of South Durham.

The constituency was renamed Hartlepool in 1974, following the administrative merger in 1967 of the local authorities covering the borough of Hartlepool and the county borough of West Hartlepool.

Boundaries

1868–1918 
The municipal borough of Hartlepool, and the townships of Throston, Stranton, and Seaton Carew.

See map on Vision of Britain website.

1918–1974 
County borough of West Hartlepool and municipal borough of Hartlepool.

Boundaries redrawn in 1918, 1950 and 1955 to reflect changes to the boundaries of the two boroughs.

Members of Parliament

Elections

Elections in the 1860s

Elections in the 1870s

Richardson resigned, causing a by-election.

Elections in the 1880s

Elections in the 1890s

Elections in the 1900s

Elections in the 1910s 

General Election 1914–15:

Another General Election was scheduled to take place before the end of 1915. The political parties had been preparing for this election, and by July 1914, the following candidates had been selected: 
Liberal: Stephen Furness
Unionist: William Gritten

Elections in the 1920s

Elections in the 1930s

Elections in the 1940s
General Election 1939–40

A General Election was scheduled to take place before the end of 1940. The parties had been preparing for this election, and by autumn 1939, the following candidates had been selected:
Conservative: William Gritten
Labour: D. T. Jones
Liberal:

*Lupton stood as a 'People's' candidate

Elections in the 1950s

Elections in the 1960s

Elections in the 1970s

See also 
 History of parliamentary constituencies and boundaries in Durham

Notes and References

Notes

References

 

Politics of the Borough of Hartlepool
Parliamentary constituencies in County Durham (historic)
Constituencies of the Parliament of the United Kingdom established in 1868
Constituencies of the Parliament of the United Kingdom disestablished in 1974